Richard Powers (born 1957) is an American novelist.

Rick, Ricky, Richie or Richard Powers may also refer to:

Richard Powers (actor) (1896–1963), American character performer a/k/a George Duryea, Tom Keene and Dick Powers
Richard Powers (unionist) (1844–1929), Irish-born American labor union leader
Richard M. Powers (1921–1996), American science fiction illustrator
Richie Powers (1930–1998), American basketball referee
Richard Gid Powers (born 1944), American historian; 2004 president of Historians of American Communism
Richard Powers (dance historian) (born 1948), American choreographer and academic
Ricky Powers (born 1970), American football player
Rick Powers (born 1995), ring name of American professional wrestler a/k/a Velveteen Dream

See also
Richard Power (disambiguation)